Anne Mette Pedersen (born 25 October 1992) is a retired Danish handball player, who last played for Odense Håndbold and the formerly Danish national team.

She participated at the 2015 World Women's Handball Championship.

References

1992 births
Living people
Danish female handball players
People from Skanderborg Municipality
Sportspeople from the Central Denmark Region